al-Jiyya (also transliterated Algie) was a Palestinian village that was depopulated during the 1948 Arab-Israeli War. It was located 19 kilometers northeast of Gaza City and had a population of 1,230, according to a 1945 survey. The village was occupied by Israel's Giv'ati Brigade on the 4th November 1948 during Operation Yoav.

History 
The village was situated on a sandy spot, surrounded by hills, on the southern coastal plain. Several wadis descended around it and it was periodically subjected to flooding. This, perhaps, explains its name, which means "water collector" in Arabic. The village has been identified with a town referred to in the Crusader records as "Algie".

Among the archaeological remains found in al-Jiyya were a stone column and the remains of a Roman mill.

Ottoman era
The village appeared without its name on the map of Pierre Jacotin compiled in 1799. The villagers reported that their village had been ruined at one point and then rebuilt by Muhammed Aby Nabbut, the governor of Jaffa and Gaza between 1807 and 1818.

In 1863 the French explorer Victor Guérin called  the village  Ed-Deir, and he estimated it had  three hundred and fifty inhabitants. Near the wells he saw several parts of columns and one  Corinthian capital, all made of  gray-white marble. He further noted sycamores, pines and acacias mimosas, at intervals, in the middle of tobacco plantations. In 1883,  the PEF's Survey of Western Palestine called it Ejjeh, and described it as "a moderate-sized mud village, with a pool to the north. On the east is a Sebil, or drinking-fountain. Beside the road to the west  are olive groves."

British  Mandate era
In the 1922 census of Palestine, conducted by the  British Mandate authorities,  Jiya had a population of 776 inhabitants,  all Muslims, increasing in the 1931 census  to 889, still all Muslims, in  188 houses.

Al-Jiyya's population  had its own mosque. The children attended school in the neighboring village of  Barbara.  The villagers installed a pump on one of the wells in the area to draw water for domestic use. The villagers worked primarily in agriculture, planting various types of grain, especially corn. Al-Jiyya was known for its cheese and dairy products, which were sold in Gaza and in  Majdal.

In the 1945 statistics El Jiya had a population of 1,230, all Muslims,  with a total of 8,506  dunams of land, according to an official land and population survey. Of this,  a total of 189 dunums was used for citrus and bananas, while 8,004 dunumus were allocated to cereals and 26 dunums were irrigated or used for orchards, while 45 dunams were built-up land.

1948 War, and aftermath
The village was captured by Israel's Giv'ati Brigade on 4 November 1948 during Operation Yoav. At the end of November 1948, Coastal Plain District troops carried  out  sweeps of the villages around and to the south of Majdal.  Al-Jiyya was one of the villages named in the orders to the IDF battalions and engineers platoon, that the villagers were to be  expelled to Gaza, and the IDF troops were "to prevent their return by destroying their villages." The path leading to the village was to be mined. The IDF troops were ordered to carry out the operation "with determination, accuracy and energy". The operation took place on 30 November. The troops found "about 40" villagers in Barbara and al-Jiyya, "composed of women, old men and children", who offered no resistance.  They were expelled to Beit Hanun, in the northern Gaza strip. Eight young men who were found were sent to a POW camp.

Following the war the area was incorporated into the State of Israel. Palestinian historian Walid Khalidi stated in 1992 that there were no traces of the village remaining and that the residents of moshav Beit Shikma had planted cantaloupes on the land.

See also
 Barid, Muslim postal network strengthened in Palestine during the Mamluk period (roads, bridges, khans); it passed through Jiyya

References

Bibliography

External links 
 al-Jiyya, PalestineRemembered.com,
 al-Jiyya,   Zochrot
Survey of Western Palestine, Map 20:   IAA, Wikimedia commons 
 Jiyya, from the Khalil Sakakini Cultural Center

District of Gaza
Arab villages depopulated during the 1948 Arab–Israeli War